Prassa (also Prassas) is the archaeological site of an ancient Minoan settlement on Crete.

Archaeology
Two Middle Minoan houses were uncovered at Prassa, which were in use until Late Minoan I.

References
 Swindale, Ian http://www.minoancrete.com/prassa.htm Retrieved 4 February 2006

External links
 http://www.minoancrete.com/prassa.htm

Minoan sites in Crete
Populated places in ancient Greece
Former populated places in Greece